Ralph Frederick Beermann (August 13, 1912 – February 17, 1977) was an American Republican politician and US Representative for Nebraska.

Early life
Born near Dakota City, Nebraska, Beermann graduated from Morningside College in Sioux City, Iowa and then attended various army specialist schools.

Career
During World War II, Beermann served in the  African and European Theaters in the US Army as part of the 601st Ordnance Battalion and the 301st Ordnance Regiment. After the war, he partnered with his six brothers (the Beermann Brothers) in farming, alfalfa dehydrating and cattle raising in Dakota County, Nebraska.

Beermann served as chairman of the Dakota County Republican Central Committee for ten years and organized the Dakota County Young Republicans. He was elected to serve the 3rd district of Nebraska in the Eighty-seventh United States Congress from January 3, 1961 to January 3, 1963; and served the 1st district in the Eighty-eighth United States Congress from January 3, 1963 to January 3, 1965. He was narrowly defeated for re-election in 1964. After leaving Congress, Beermann returned to his business pursuits, but from 1972 to 1977, he served on the board of the Nebraska Public Power District.

Death
Beermann died in a plane crash when the single-engine plane that he was piloting crashed at Sioux City Municipal Airport in Iowa on February 17, 1977; his age was 64 years and 188 days. He is interred at the Dakota City Cemetery.

He was a member of the Lutheran Church and a member of the Farm Bureau, American Legion, Veterans of Foreign Wars and the Kiwanis. Beermann was survived by his wife, Marjorie Beermann, and four brothers.

References

External links
 
 
 
 
  at the Nebraska State Historical Society

Morningside University alumni
United States Army personnel of World War II
American Lutherans
Victims of aviation accidents or incidents in the United States
1912 births
1977 deaths
Accidental deaths in Iowa
People from Dakota City, Nebraska
Military personnel from Nebraska
Republican Party members of the United States House of Representatives from Nebraska
20th-century American politicians
20th-century Lutherans